Negro É Lindo is the eighth album by Brazilian artist Jorge Ben, released in 1971. The title is a translation of the slogan "Black is beautiful" to Portuguese. The album has a song called "Cassius Marcelo Clay" paying homage to boxer and black activist Muhammad Ali.

Track listing 
All songs composed by Jorge Ben except when noted.

References

Jorge Ben albums
1971 albums
Philips Records albums